Norridge School District 80 is an elementary school district headquartered in Norridge, Illinois, in the Chicago metropolitan area.

It operates two schools: James Giles School (grades 5–8) and John Leigh School (grades Pre-Kindergarten to 4). The district headquarters and board office are at the Leigh School.

History

In November 2016 the Superintendent proposed a tax increase that would bring in $60.6 million, but 77% of the voters rejected it. The district responded, in April 2017, by laying off three people who were in support roles, though it got back three laid off teachers and added a principal. 

The district is currently building a Science center that will promote on-sight learning in STEAM. 

In 2021, during the COVID-19 pandemic in Illinois, the district began having both in-person and virtual learning options as vaccine usage increased.

Programs
In 2018 the district announced that a decrease in the budget would result in the Band closure, so advocates began privately raising money and making a Facebook page campaigning to save it. The band program was saved by the community. 

As of 2020, the district expanded the STEAM program by creating a large onsite Science Center. Additional  SD80 programs are Soccer, Volleyball, Softball, Cheer, track and field, Basketball, cadet and concert Band.

References

External links
 Norridge School District 80

School districts in Cook County, Illinois